Joel Bran (born 23 December 1981) is a Guatemalan weightlifter. He competed in the men's super heavyweight event at the 2004 Summer Olympics.

References

1981 births
Living people
Guatemalan male weightlifters
Olympic weightlifters of Guatemala
Weightlifters at the 2004 Summer Olympics
Place of birth missing (living people)
21st-century Guatemalan people